The 2015 PTT Thailand Open was a women's professional tennis tournament played on outdoor hard courts. It was the 24th and last edition of the PTT Thailand Open and part of the International category on the 2015 WTA Tour. It took place at the Dusit Thani Hotel in Pattaya, Thailand from 9 February until 15 February 2015. Unseeded Daniela Hantuchová won the singles title, her third at the event after 2011 and 2012, and earned $43,000 first-prize money.

Points and prize money

Point distribution

Prize money 

1Qualifiers prize money is also the Round of 32 prize money.
*per team

Singles main-draw entrants

Seeds 

1 Rankings as of February 2, 2015.

Other entrants 
The following players received wildcards into the main draw:
  Nicha Lertpitaksinchai
  Tamarine Tanasugarn
  Vera Zvonareva

The following players received entry from the qualifying draw:
  Chan Yung-jan
  Misa Eguchi
  Elizaveta Kulichkova
  Xu Yifan

The following players received entry as lucky losers:
  Yuliya Beygelzimer
  Zhu Lin

Withdrawals 
Before the tournament
  Denisa Allertová → replaced by  Evgeniya Rodina
  Yaroslava Shvedova → replaced by  Zhu Lin
  Tereza Smitková → replaced by  Duan Yingying
  Elina Svitolina → replaced by  Yuliya Beygelzimer

Retirements 
  Zhu Lin (right shoulder injury)

Doubles main-draw entrants

Seeds 

1 Rankings are as of February 2, 2015.

Other entrants 
The following pair received wildcards into the main draw:
  Elizaveta Kulichkova /  Evgeniya Rodina

Withdrawals 
During the tournament
  Anastasia Rodionova /  Vera Zvonareva (unspecified reason)

Finals

Singles 

  Daniela Hantuchová defeated  Ajla Tomljanović, 3–6, 6–3, 6–4

Doubles 

  Chan Hao-ching /  Chan Yung-jan defeated  Shuko Aoyama /  Tamarine Tanasugarn, 2–6, 6–4, [10–3]

References

External links 
 Tournament draws

 
 WTA Tour
 in women's tennis
Tennis, WTA Tour, PTT Thailand Open
Tennis, WTA Tour, PTT Thailand Open

Tennis, WTA Tour, PTT Thailand Open